The 2017–18 Miami RedHawks men's basketball team represented Miami University during the 2017–18 NCAA Division I men's basketball season. The RedHawks, led by first-year head coach Jack Owens, played their home games at Millett Hall, as members of the East Division of the Mid-American Conference. They finished the season 16–18, 8–10 in MAC play to finish in third place in the East Division. They defeated Ohio in the first round of the MAC tournament to advance to the quarterfinals where they lost to Toledo. They were invited to the College Basketball Invitational where they lost in the first round to Campbell.

Previous season
The RedHawks finished the 2016–17 season 11–21, 4–14 in MAC play to finish in last place. As the No. 12 seed in the MAC tournament, they lost in the first round to Western Michigan.

Head coach John Cooper was fired on March 10, 2017 after five seasons at Miami. Purdue associate head coach Jack Owens was named the new head coach on March 29.

Roster

Schedule and results

|-
!colspan=9 style=| Non-conference regular season

|-
!colspan=9 style=| MAC regular season

|-
!colspan=9 style=| MAC tournament

|-
!colspan=9 style=| CBI

See also
 2017–18 Miami RedHawks women's basketball team

References

Miami
Miami RedHawks men's basketball seasons
Miami